Stuart is a city in and the seat of Martin County, Florida, United States. Located in southeastern Florida, Stuart is the largest of four incorporated municipalities in Martin County. The population is 17,425 according to the 2020 U.S. census. Stuart is the 126th largest city in Florida based on official 2019 estimates from the U.S. Census Bureau. It is part of the Port St. Lucie, Florida Metropolitan Statistical Area.

Stuart is frequently cited as one of the best small towns to visit in the U.S., in large part because of its proximity to the St. Lucie River and Indian River Lagoon.

History
In the 18th century, several Spanish galleons were shipwrecked in the Martin County area of Florida's Treasure Coast. The multiple wrecks were reportedly the result of a hurricane, and the ships were carrying unknown quantities of gold and silver. Some of this treasure has since been recovered, and its presence resulted in the region's name. In 1832, pirate Pedro Gilbert, who often used a sandbar off the coast as a lure to unsuspecting prey, chased and caught the Mexican, a U.S. merchant ship. Although he attempted to burn the ship and kill the crew, they survived to report the incident, ultimately resulting in the capture and execution of Gilbert and his crew. The bar from which he lured his intended booty is named "Gilbert's Bar" on nautical charts.

The Treasure Coast area that became Stuart was first settled by non-Native Americans in 1870. In 1875, a United States Lifesaving Station was established on Hutchinson Island, near Stuart. Today, the station is known as Gilbert's Bar House of Refuge and is on the National Register of Historic Places.

From 1893 to 1895, the area was called Potsdam. This name was chosen by Otto Stypmann, a local landowner originally 
from Potsdam, Germany. Stypmann, with his brother Ernest, owned the land that would become downtown Stuart. Henry Flagler's Florida East Coast Railway connected the area to Daytona Beach in 1892 and Miami in 1896.

Potsdam was renamed Stuart in 1895, in honor of Homer Hine (Jack) Stuart Jr., a local landowner who owned a 160 acres around the railway station. Rue, Luckhardt, Krueger, Crary, Armellinis, were some of the prominent settler families.

When Stuart was incorporated as a town in 1914, it was located in Palm Beach County. In 1925, Stuart was chartered as a city and named the county seat of the newly created Martin County.

The City of Stuart formally adopted the slogan Sailfish Capital of the World in 1957, following pressure from the Stuart Chamber of Commerce, owing to the many sailfish found in the ocean off Martin County. The slogan is still used by the City. Some have also assigned Guatemala the namesake.

From 1871 to 2005, 19 hurricanes passed through Stuart, including Isbell (1964), Frances (2004), Jeanne (2004), and Wilma (2005).

Geography

Climate

According to the Köppen climate classification, Stuart has a tropical rainforest climate (Af), with hot, humid summers and warm, drier winters. Stuart has a noticeably seasonal precipitation pattern, with summer being the wettest season and winter being the driest.

Summers feature hot temperatures and frequent thunderstorms. Late summer brings an increased threat of tropical storms and hurricanes, though landfalls are rare. Several major hurricanes have impacted Stuart since 1900, with Hurricane David in 1979 and hurricanes Frances and Jeanne causing moderate damage to the area in 2004.

Winter brings much cooler and drier air.

Demographics

2020 census

As of the 2020 United States census, there were 17,425 people, 7,263 households, and 3,562 families residing in the city.

2010 census
As of the census of 2010, there were 15,593 people, 7,220 households, and 3,422 families residing in the city. The racial makeup of the city was 83.30% White, 12.33% African American, 0.26% Native American, 0.66% Asian, 0.03% Pacific Islander, 1.97% from other races, and 1.46% from two or more races. Hispanic or Latino of any race were 6.29% of the population.

There were 7,220 households, out of which 15.0% had children under the age of 18 living with them, 34.7% were married couples living together, 9.7% had a female householder with no husband present, and 52.6% were non-families. 46.1% of all households were made up of individuals, and 26.1% had someone living alone who was 65 years of age or older.  The average household size was 1.88 and the average family size was 2.60.

In the city, the population was spread out, with 14.5% under the age of 18, 6.9% from 18 to 24, 24.5% from 25 to 44, 21.2% from 45 to 64, and 32.9% who were 65 years of age or older.  The median age was 48 years. For every 100 females, there were 87.8 males.  For every 100 females age 18 and over, there were 84.4 males.

The median income for a household in the city was $35,954, and the median income for a family was $47,736. Males had a median income of $29,151 versus $23,125 for females. The per capita income for the city was $25,020.  About 7.8% of families and 11.2% of the population were below the poverty line, including 17.5% of those under age 18 and 9.1% of those age 65 or over. Stuart is publicly seen as a new coming old city, starting a new boom in its local economy with construction of a new bridge, rise of new buildings and roadways being restored.

The cost of living in Stuart is 88, on a relative scale where the U.S. average is represented by 100.

Economy
Stuart hosts one of the two Florida Department of Health offices in Martin County, the other being in Indiantown.

Various businesses cater to tourists, such as fishing charters, boating charters, sailing, cruises, SCUBA and snorkeling, and nature tours.

Top employers
According to the city's 2011 Comprehensive Annual Financial Report, the top employers in the Stuart area are:

Arts and culture

Points of interest
Notable historic properties in downtown in range from the early 1880s to 1940s, representing a mix of Beaux-Arts, colonial revival, spanish mediterranean, Art Deco, frame vernacular, masonry vernacular architecture styles.

 Audubon of Martin County
 Lyric Theatre
 Stuart Heritage Museum
 Elliott Museum
 Krueger House, a historic house and National Register of Historic Places
 The Barn Theatre
 Geoffrey C. Smith Galleries
 Tropical Ranch Botanical Garden
 Florida Oceanographic Coastal Center
Environmental Studies Council
Sailfish Splash Waterpark

Education
Public education in Stuart is administered by the Martin County School District.

Infrastructure

Transportation
Witham Field is a public-use airport located one mile southeast of the central business district owned by Martin County.

US Route 1 passes northwest-southeast through Stuart. The coastal route A1A heads east from Stuart towards Hutchinson Island, and the road heads southeast out of Stuart. Florida State Road 76 heads south from the city, and Florida State Road 714 heads west from the city.

Stuart has a yacht club and several marinas serving private crafts of various sizes.

Local transit is provided by the county.

Until 1968 the Florida East Coast Railway operated Jacksonville to Miami service, with a station stop in Stuart. Until 1963 long distance passenger trains included the Illinois Central Railroad's City of Miami and the Louisville & Nashville Railroad's South Wind both heading from Chicago; and they included the Atlantic Coast Line Railroad's East Coast Champion, the Havana Special, and the winter-only Florida Special originating from New York.

The Brightline passenger rail company is extending to the Space Coast and Orlando, north from the West Palm Beach terminus of its West Palm Beach - Miami service. While the City of Stuart initially appeared eager to become the sole station along the Brightline's Treasure Coast length, the City has more recently reiterated concerns about the project's effects on traffic.

Notable people

 Dan Bakkedahl, correspondent on The Daily Show
 Paul Bley, jazz pianist
 Cynthia S. Burnett-Haney (1840–1932), educator, lecturer, temperance reformer, newspaper editor; Haney Circle in Stuart was named after her
 Nelson Burton Jr., professional bowler and longtime TV analyst
 Kelly Carrington, Playboy Playmate October 2008
 James Gould Cozzens, Pulitzer Prize-winning author
 James Davis, professional football player
 Ralph Evinrude, CEO of Outboard Motor Company with a test facility in Stuart, married Frances Langford and retired to Jensen Beach
 Derek Fathauer, professional golfer who currently plays on the PGA Tour
 Cleveland Gary, professional football player
 Whitney Gaskell, novelist
 Ed Hearn, Major League Baseball player and motivational speaker
 Davy Jones, musician with The Monkees
 Chris Marquette, actor
 John McHale, player and executive in Major League Baseball
 Corey McIntyre, professional football player
 Rusty Meacham, former Major League Baseball player
 Nicole Melichar, professional tennis player 
 Vaughn Monroe, big band singer
 Zack Mosley, cartoonist and creator of The Adventures of Smilin' Jack
 Scott Proctor, pitcher for the Doosan Bears of the Korea Baseball Organization
 Judge Reinhold, actor
 Kathy Rinaldi, professional tennis player
 Lee Rinker, PGA Tour Golf player
 Roger Schank, leading visionary in artificial intelligence, cognitive science, and learning theory
 Will Sheehey, professional basketball player

Stuart in popular culture 
In 1973, the movie Little Laura and Big John, a highly fictionalized version of the true story of John Ashley and Laura Upthegrove, was filmed in Stuart.

References

External links

 City of Stuart Website
 

Stuart, Florida
Cities in Martin County, Florida
Populated places on the Intracoastal Waterway in Florida
County seats in Florida
Port St. Lucie metropolitan area
Cities in Florida